Nina Vsevolod Fedoroff (born April 9, 1942) is an American molecular biologist known for her research in life sciences and biotechnology, especially transposable elements or jumping genes. and plant stress response. In 2007, President George W. Bush awarded her the National Medal of Science, she is also a member of the United States National Academy of Sciences,  the American Academy of Arts and Sciences, the European Academy of Sciences, and the American Academy of Microbiology.

Early Days

Fedoroff, whose father was a Russian immigrant to the US and her mother a first generation immigrant, was born in Cleveland, Ohio. Her first language was Russian. When she was nine years old her family moved to Fayetteville, New York,  a suburb of the city of Syracuse.

She then relocated to Philadelphia where she planned to study music but returned to study science at Syracuse University. She graduated summa cum laude in 1966 from Syracuse University with a dual major in biology and chemistry. She received her PhD in molecular biology 1972 from The Rockefeller University.

Research career

After graduating from Rockefeller University in 1972 she joined the faculty of the University of California, Los Angeles, where she did research into nuclear RNA. She moved in 1978 to the Carnegie Institution for Science in Baltimore, Maryland, worked on developmental biology at the Department of Embryology, where she pioneered DNA sequencing and worked out the nucleotide sequence of the first complete gene. In 1978, she also joined the faculty of Johns Hopkins University Biology Department, where she worked on the molecular characterization of maize transposable elements or jumping genes, for which Barbara McClintock was awarded a Nobel Prize in 1983.

Academic positions
In 1995, Fedoroff arrived at Pennsylvania State University as the Verne M. Willaman professor of Life Sciences and founded and directed the organization now known as the Huck Institutes of the Life Sciences. In 2002, she was appointed an Evan Pugh professor, the university's highest academic honor. In 2013 Federoff was a distinguished visiting professor at King Abdullah University of Science and Technology (KAUST), and a member of the external faculty of the Santa Fe Institute.

Honors
In 1990, Fedoroff was honored with the Howard Taylor Ricketts Award from University of Chicago, and in 1992 she received the New York Academy of Sciences Outstanding Contemporary Women Scientist Award. In 1997, Fedoroff received the John P. McGovern Science and Society Medal from Sigma Xi. In 2003, she was awarded Syracuse University's George Arents Pioneer medal.

In 2001, President Bill Clinton appointed Fedoroff to the National Science Board, which oversees the National Science Foundation. which administers the science awards. Fedoroff was Science and Technology Adviser to U.S. Secretaries of State, Condoleezza Rice and Hillary Clinton and from 2007 to 2010 to the administrator Rajiv Shah for the United States Agency for International Development.
In 2007, President George W. Bush awarded her the National Medal of Science in the field of Biological Sciences, the highest award for lifetime achievement in scientific research in the United States.
Fedoroff was President of the American Association for the Advancement of Science (AAAS) from 2011 to 2012.  She is a member of the United States National Academy of Sciences,  the American Academy of Arts and Sciences, the European Academy of Sciences, and the American Academy of Microbiology.

Private life
Fedoroff has three children and seven grandchildren.  She enjoys music, theatre and singing. Fedoroff was a single mother, and as she was studying and trying to make a living, she was able to raise her three children alone.

Bibliography

Books

Nina Fedoroff, Mendel in the Kitchen: A Scientist's View of Genetically Modified Foods, National Academy Press, 2004, 
Nina Fedoroff, Plant Transposons and Genome Dynamics in Evolution, Barnes & Noble, Wiley, John & Sons, Incorporated, 2013,

Essays and reporting

See also
Barbara McClintock

References

External links
The Huck Institutes of the Life Sciences
Nina V. Fedoroff, Evan Pugh Professor of Biology, Willaman Professor of Life Science, Penn State University 
Faces of Penn State 

American women biologists
Living people
1942 births
Fayetteville-Manlius High School alumni
Syracuse University College of Arts and Sciences alumni
Rockefeller University alumni
Pennsylvania State University faculty
United States National Science Foundation officials
Scientists from Cleveland
American geneticists
National Medal of Science laureates
Members of the United States National Academy of Sciences
Presidents of the American Association for the Advancement of Science
People of the United States Agency for International Development
University of California, Los Angeles faculty
Johns Hopkins University faculty
People from Fayetteville, New York
Cosmos (Australian magazine) people
Santa Fe Institute people
Scientists from New York (state)
American people of Russian descent